Fabien Centonze (born 16 January 1996) is a French professional footballer who plays as a right-back for Ligue 1 club Nantes. He formerly played for Evian Thonon Gaillard, Clermont Foot, Lens, and Metz.

References

External links
 

1996 births
Living people
People from Voiron
Sportspeople from Isère
French footballers
Footballers from Auvergne-Rhône-Alpes
Association football defenders
Ligue 1 players
Ligue 2 players
Championnat National 3 players
Thonon Evian Grand Genève F.C. players
Clermont Foot players
RC Lens players
FC Metz players
FC Nantes players
French people of Italian descent